A dental therapist is a member of the dental team who provides preventive and restorative dental care for children and adults. The precise role varies and is dependent on the therapist's education and the various dental regulations and guidelines of each country.

A dental therapist is a licensed professional oral health educator; a clinical operator who uses preventive therapeutic care with a group or individual that attends with oral diseases and helps maintain good or better oral health care.

History
In 1913, Dr Norman K. Cox, the President of the New Zealand Dental Association, proposed a system of school clinics operated by the state and staffed by 'oral hygienists' to address the dental needs of children between the ages of 6 and 14 years. At the time, the idea was considered to be unorthodox, but in 1920, at a special meeting of the New Zealand Dental Association, 16 members voted for the adoption of school dental nurses with 7 opposed to the proposal. Such a drastic change in the voting could be accredited to the refusal of New Zealand troops during the first world war. The recruits were rejected due to rampant and uncontrolled dental diseases.

School dental nurses were to provide diagnostic and restorative services to children '...in a rigidly structured set of methods and procedures which spare her the anxiety of making choices'. In Great Britain, during the first world war, 'dental dressers' were used to carry out examinations and treatment for children in parts of England. Their role was eliminated by the Dentist Act of 1921 because of hostility to the role on the part of the dentist profession. They were later re-introduced, on the strength of the New Zealand scheme, as dental therapists when the high dental needs of children were 'rediscovered' in the 1960s, carrying out similar services but under the prescription of a dentist who carried out the examination and care plan.

The success of New Zealand's program was so significant that many countries facing similar needs adopted programs which mirrored the ones initially established in New Zealand. School dental services which followed similar training became popular in countries such as Canada, South Africa, the Netherlands (temporarily), Fiji, Hong Kong, Malaysia and the Philippines and in 2000, 28 countries around the world utilised dental therapists. In today's modern day practices, in all previously mentioned countries dental therapists are becoming more recognised and employable due to the identifiable need for dental professionals in underserved areas.

Training

Australia

Dental therapists are no longer trained in Australia, and instead oral health therapists are being trained. An oral health therapist is trained as both a dental therapist and a dental hygienist with a focus on health promotion and disease prevention.

Oral health therapy training occurs at university level and therefore completion of secondary schooling to a high standard is mandatory, including certain pre-requisite subjects that differ between states/territories and between the universities that offer the courses themselves.  This specific information can be found at https://web.archive.org/web/20140126105917/http://jobguide.thegoodguides.com.au/occupation/Oral-Health-Therapist  

The training varies, depending on what is offered at each university, but the golden rule is that once graduated an oral health therapist can only perform what they have been formally trained in. 
 

Oral Health Therapists are trained to perform:
 Educate and motivate children and the community
 Dental examinations 
 Cleaning teeth 
 Restoring teeth 
 Local anaesthetic 
 Extracting deciduous (baby) teeth 
 Taking radiographs (X-rays) 
 Preventive treatments – fissure sealants, fluoride applications, oral hygiene instruction 
 Taking impressions for mouthguards
 Refer complex problems to dentists 
 Educate school canteens about health foods 
 Liaise with other health care professionals
Dental Therapists use number of different tools and technology to complete their dental tasks such as X-ray equipment, hand powered tools such as drills and polishers along with the use of computers and printers to record and store data.

The average salary of a Dental Therapist in Australia is generally $1150.00 per week being full-time and before tax. A benefit of working in this profession is that Dental Therapists work normal hours such as 8am-5pm, Monday to Friday.

New Zealand

Since 2002, dental therapists are trained exclusively at either University of Otago in Dunedin (at New Zealand's only Dental School) or at Auckland University of Technology. The qualification (Bachelor of Oral Health at Otago, Bachelor of Health Science in Oral Health at AUT) enables graduates to register and practise as both a dental therapist and dental hygienist.

Prior to this, development of the dental therapists began in New Zealand. They were initially trained as 'school dental nurses' providing preventive and simple restorative care to children aged up to 12 years old. They were employed to treat children at a school dental service including treatment of pre-school children.

From 1921-1990 the Department of Health ran the Wellington School for Dental Nurses, which offered a 2-year Certificate. In 1952 this programme was extended with the creation of the Auckland School for Dental Nurses, and in 1956 it was again extended by opening the Christchurch School for Dental Nurses. Both Auckland and Christchurch Schools closed in 1981. In 1991, the profession was renamed from 'school dental nurse' to 'dental therapist' to align with overseas designations, and training was taken over by the Department of Education. Training continued in Wellington, at Wellington Polytechnic. The qualification offered was a 2-year Certificate in Dental Therapy, which in 1995 was changed to a 2-year Diploma in Dental Therapy.

In 1999 University of Otago took over the 2 year Diploma in Dental Therapy, which was offered until the introduction of the BOH degree in 2007.

In 2002, both University of Otago and AUT debuted 3-year Bachelor of Health Science degrees. The Otago degree was endorsed in dental therapy, while the AUT degree was in oral health, but still only allowed for registration as a therapist. At Otago, this was offered in addition to the 2-year diploma. Both degrees were discontinued in 2007. The current 'dual degree' was introduced at AUT in 2006 and at Otago in 2007. This was in response to a shortage and increased legislative requirements.

In order to practise, all therapists must annually register with the Dental Council. For the 2014-2015 cycle, the cost of this is $758.23. One therapist is represented on the Council for a three-year term.

Dental therapists in New Zealand work exclusively with children under 18 years old. Their duties include examination and routine dental treatment and prevention work, such as fillings, fissure sealants and extractions of first teeth. Duties may also include giving local anaesthetic and taking X-rays. Therapists also advise patients and their parents how to care for the patient's mouth.

Dental therapists generally work for a local District Health Board (DHB), but some work in private practice.

Dental therapists can become members of the New Zealand Dental & Oral Health Therapists Association. The association was founded in 1935, as the New Zealand State Dental Nurses’ Institute.

United Kingdom

Training has been combined with that of dental hygienists and can be obtained through two courses, a combined Dental Hygiene and Therapy 27-month full-time course or a Bachelors in Oral Health Science 3-year full-time course. Once qualified, a dental hygienist and dental therapist must be registered with the General Dental Council, and uses the post-nominal letters DHDT. The therapists have a large focus on patients' self care, creating home care plans and identifying areas where patients express deficits in efficacy of plaque removal. Dental therapists in the UK are often employed in the community dental profession and perform a range of treatment, as outlined in their professional scope of practice. Some of the procedures carried out by UK dental therapists include examinations, taking radiographs (X-rays), fillings (restorations), implementing preventive strategies (fluoride application, dental sealants (fissure seals), oral hygiene instruction) and dental health education.

United States

The United States are increasing employment and training opportunities for dental therapists in order to reduce to the need and to increase access to care for Americans. Alaska, Minnesota, Maine, and Vermont are the four main states that are advocating dental therapists into their communities. These dental therapists can perform a number of basic clinical dental treatment and preventive services under the general and indirect supervision of dentists. The dental therapist as a member of the oral healthcare team can provide restorative dental treatment services, disease prevention and oral health promotion programs. These procedures include exposing radiographs/X-rays, administering local anaesthetic, administering nitrous oxide, application of topical preventive or prophylactic agents including fluoride varnishes and fissure sealants, preparations and restorations of primary and permanent teeth, repair of defective prosthetic devices, and recementing of permanent crowns. For the scope of practice https://mn.gov/boards/assets/NEW_DentalTherapistSCOPE_tcm21-285567.pdf

Responsibilities

The following tasks are regularly performed by Dental Therapists.
 Educate patients, parents, schools and communities about the progression of dental disease, how to prevent dental disease and how to maintain good oral health.
 Treat patients via giving comprehensive oral examination, dietary advice, help to modify any risk factors for dental disease, give oral hygiene instruction to patient and parent/guardian, remove and fill dental caries. Extract deciduous (baby) teeth under local anaesthetic, perform pulpotomy treatment on indicated deciduous teeth, take radiographs of the patient's teeth, provide dental sealant protection when necessary, administer fluoride therapy and provide a professional clean.
 Refer and Communicate - dental therapists are able to refer to a dentist when a problem becomes complex, they work within schools, including canteens in recommending healthy options for students and staff. They can give oral hygiene instruction to classes and can communicate with other health care providers i.e. Immunisation clinics and maternal health care nurses.

Role within the dental team
The dental profession involves the study, diagnosis, prevention and treatment of diseases, disorders and conditions involving the oral cavity and surrounding structures. Dental therapists practice in a team situation alongside a practising dentist and have a tradition of being part of the dental team primarily to provide dental care to children through school dental services.

The dental therapists role in the dental team can include the provisions of oral health assessment, treatment planning, management and prevention for children, adolescents and adults, which is dependent on their training. In many practices dental therapists are limited to the provision of restorative dental care and extractions to those aged 25 and under, however there are some settings where the dental or oral health therapist can provide these services to someone of any age where the clinician has developed his or her scope of practice.

For around forty years  in Australia, dental therapists have been practicing under guidance of dentists providing diagnostic, preventive, restorative and health promotion services to children and adolescents.

Common procedures performed by dental therapists include examination, prescribing and exposing intra and extra oral dental xrays, administration of local anaesthesia, preparation and restoration of carious lesions, pulpal therapies, extraction of deciduous teeth and preventive therapies such as fissure sealants and fluoride application. Oral health education and promotion also plays a large part in the dental therapists role.

Professional support for the role of the dental therapist in the dental team has been widely accepted in Australia and New Zealand, where their role came about in response to population need from the rising numbers of caries prevalence in children. This same support has not followed in all countries, with the United States referring to dental therapists as ‘lower level practitioners’ with a study showing 75% of US paediatric dentists not knowing what a dental therapist was and 71% of them disagreeing to add them as part of the dental team.

Typical day 
The typical day of a dental therapist can vary due to the different employers and state regulations, but they will primarily follow the same tasks; 
 Examining (check-up) the teeth of children and adolescences that may need to be treated for dental disease 
 Providing a dental treatment for children which can include cleaning teeth, X-rays, fillings for teeth that may have cavities, fissure sealants which can prevent cavities, extraction of deciduous (first) teeth by local anesthetic, and generally education for children about teeth health and care
 Referring dental issues that are not handled by Dental Therapists such as Orthodontic work, to an Orthodontist. 
 Educating and encouraging healthy teeth care habits to children in the clinic and classroom 
 Recommending healthy food choices to parents and children so they can look after their oral health 
 Filing and recording information about children's teeth

Qualities and attributes 
There are many qualities and attributes that are needed to be a Dental Therapist, especially because they find themselves working with young children day to day, some of these are;
 Ability to work cooperatively within a team environment 
 Precise verbal and written communication to talk to colleagues, children and parents 
 Hand-eye coordination that is precise 
 Be able to build trust with young children, make sure they do not feel threatened or afraid 
 Soft and gentle personality that is open and willing to talk to others

See also
 Dental hygienist
 Dental technician
 Denturist
 Dentist

References

Dentistry occupations